The Kerman Fire Temple (Persian: آتشکده کرمان) is a Zoroastrian fire temple in Kerman, Iran. The structure is also the house to the only anthropology museum of Zoroastrians in the world.

History 
The temple was built in 1924 during the reign of Reza Shah Pahlavi, and the fire contained in it was transferred from India to this place and is said to originate from Adur Farnbag, one of the three holiest fires in Sassnian times.

The idea to make the place a museum was first expressed in 1983. In 2005 the museum was finally inaugurated. the museum contains a handwritten version of Gathas estimated to be at least 200 years old.

It was listed among the Iranian national heritage sites with the number 4190 on October 2, 2001.

See also 

 Fire Temple of Yazd

References 

Fire temples
Fire temples in Iran
Religious buildings and structures in Iran
Zoroastrianism in Iran
Buildings and structures in Kerman Province
Anthropology museums
Tourist attractions in Kerman Province
National works of Iran
1924 establishments in Iran